The LL-100 panel is a group of 100 human leukemia and lymphoma cell line, can be used in model of biomedical research.

Purpose 
LL-100 panel cell lines cover the full spectrum of human leukemia and lymphoma including T-cell, B-cell and myeloid malignancies.

List of LL-100 Cell Lines

Pre-B-ALL

B-NHL: Burkitt/B-ALL

B-NHL: CLL/PLL

B-NHL: DLBCL ABC

B-NHL: DLBCL GC

B-NHL: HCL

B-NHL: MCL

B-NHL: PEL

B-NHL: PMBL

Multiple Myeloma/PCL

Hodgkin Lymphoma

T-ALL/T-LL

Mature T-Malignancy

NK Malignancy

ALCL

AML myelocytic

AML monocytic

AML erythroid

AML megakaryocytic

CML myeloid BC

CML lymphoid BC

MPN

See also
 NCI-60, 60 human cancer cell lines used by the NCI
 List of breast cancer cell lines

References 

Leukemia